Fletcher Place is a historic district and neighborhood in the city of Indianapolis, Indiana named after Calvin Fletcher, a prominent local banker, farmer and state senator.

The neighborhood is clearly defined by I-70/I-65 to the south and East Street to the west. The northern border of the neighborhood is along South Street, Lord Street, Fletcher Avenue, and Bates Street, depending on specific location. The eastern border of the neighborhood is Virginia Avenue in some places, while it is I-65 in a few spots, and Calvary Street in a few areas.

Fletcher Place is surrounded by the Wholesale District to the north, Eli Lilly and Company to the west, Bates-Hendricks neighborhood to the south, and Fountain Square to the east and southeast.

Fletcher Place is the home to a few of Indianapolis' keynote restaurants: Milktooth, Bluebeard, Iaria's Italian, Bosphorus Istanbul Cafe, and Dugout Bar. Additionally, Eli Lilly and Company and Anthem have their world headquarters bordering Fletcher Place, making it a magnet neighborhood for Indianapolis' health-care industry professionals.

Fletcher Place Historic District
The Fletcher Place Historic District is a  national historic district in the neighborhood that was listed on the National Register of Historic Places in 1982. In 1982, it included 140 contributing buildings that were deemed to contribute to the historic character of the area. It developed between about 1855 and 1924, and includes representative examples of Italianate, Gothic Revival, and Queen Anne style architecture. Notable buildings include the Briggs Flats (1893), The Lavon Building (c. 1885–1890), Ada Apartments (c. 1900–1910), Fletcher Place Methodist Church, school building (1857 and later), and a gasoline station (1919).

See also
List of Indianapolis neighborhoods

References

External links

Fletcher Place Neighborhood Association
 The City of Indianapolis's historic preservation plan for Fletcher Place

Historic districts on the National Register of Historic Places in Indiana
Gothic Revival architecture in Indiana
Italianate architecture in Indiana
Queen Anne architecture in Indiana
Populated places established in 1855
Neighborhoods in Indianapolis
Historic districts in Indianapolis
National Register of Historic Places in Indianapolis
1855 establishments in Indiana